Jai Prakash Yadav is an Indian politician from Bharatiya Janata Party, Bihar and a first term Member of Bihar Legislative Assembly from Narpatganj Assembly constituency.

References 

1955 births
Living people
Bihar MLAs 2020–2025
Bharatiya Janata Party politicians from Bihar